Dorokhovo (also Bezhetsk,  Bezhetsk, or Dorokhov) is an former air base in Bezhetsky District of Tver Oblast, Russia, located 7 km southwest of Bezhetsk. It was a small interceptor base with about 10 alert pads for fighter aircraft and some other pads and tarmac space.  In 1967 it received some of the first Sukhoi Su-15 (Flagon) interceptors.

It was home to 611th Interceptor Aviation Regiment (611 IAP) flying 39 Sukhoi Su-15 aircraft in the 1970s and Sukhoi Su-27 aircraft by the 1990s.  It also had MiG-31 aircraft. From the 1960s to the 1990s the regiment was part of the 3rd Air Defence Corps of the Moscow Air Defence District.

References

Soviet Air Force bases
Soviet Air Defence Force bases
Russian Air Force bases